Saint-Étienne-lès-Remiremont (literally Saint-Étienne near Remiremont) is a commune in the Vosges department in Grand Est in northeastern France.

See also
Communes of the Vosges department

References

External links

 City Site
 Ciy Site2

Communes of Vosges (department)